Ian McKinley (born 4 December 1989) is a retired Irish-born, Italian rugby union player. He played at fly-half and he represented Italy on 9 occasions.

Career
In 2011, after playing 6 times for Irish province Leinster, McKinley was forced to retire from rugby union after losing the sight in his left eye. After his retirement, he moved to Italy to work as a coach for junior sides.

Despite the blindness in one eye, McKinley made a return to rugby in 2014 in Italy using specially manufactured goggles, firstly with Leonorso in a regional third division match, in which McKinley scored 28 points, and then with Viadana on a two-year contract in the National Championship of Excellence, which, in turn, led to him being signed by another Italian side, Zebre as Fly-half cover for the 2015 Rugby World Cup and 2016 Six Nations Championship. Shortly afterwards, McKinley was signed by Treviso ahead of the 2016–17 Pro12 season.
He played with Treviso until 2020.

Since McKinley never played a game for Ireland before his first retirement, having spent three years in Italian rugby made him eligible to represent Italy on the international stage. Italy's head coach Conor O'Shea included McKinley in his squad for the 2017 Summer Tests, but decided not to field him in any game. 
On 11 November 2017, however, Ian McKinley played his first international game for Italy, in an Autumn Internationals test match against Fiji, subbed in after 62 minutes for Carlo Canna. Italy won that game 19–10, with McKinley scoring the last goal kick.

References

External links
Ireland U20 Profile

Living people
1989 births
Rugby union players from Dublin (city)
Irish rugby union players
Leinster Rugby players
Rugby union fly-halves
Zebre Parma players
Benetton Rugby players
Italy international rugby union players
University College Dublin R.F.C. players
People educated at St Columba's College, Dublin
Sportspeople with a vision impairment
Irish rugby union coaches
Naturalised citizens of Italy
Italian rugby union players
Irish expatriate sportspeople in Italy
Naturalised sports competitors